Ken Renard (1905-1993) was an actor in the United States. He had roles in Strange Fruit on stage in 1945, the film True Grit (1969) and the television series Robert Montgomery Presents (1950–1957). He was born on November 19, 1905 in Port of Spain, Trinidad as Kenneth Fitzroy Renwick. He died on November 16, 1993 in Los Angeles County, California.

He portrayed Toussaint Louverture in the film Lydia Bailey. He appeared on the television show The Name of the Game (1968).

Filmography

Film
Sugar Hill Baby (1932? 1938?)
Murder with Music (1941) as Bill Smith, using parts of the film Mistaken IdentityKiller Diller (1948) as The Great VoodooLydia Bailey (1952) as Toussaint L'Ouverture (uncredited)Something of Value (1957) as Karanja, father of KimaniThese Thousand Hills (1959) as Happy, the waiter (uncredited)Home From the Hill (1960) as Chauncey (Hunnicutt butler)Papa's Delicate Condition (1963) as WalterThe Chase (1966) as SamTrue Grit (1969) as YarnellDouble Indelnity (1973, TV Movie) as PorterSparkle (1976) as Shimmy DodsonTreasure of Matecumbe (1976) as CustomerThe Farmer (1977) as GumshoeExorcist II: The Heretic (1977) as AbbotPete's Dragon (1977) as African-American Townsman (uncredited)

TelevisionThe Posthumous Dead (1950)Thriller (1961) as Jacob BlountSam Benedict (1962, Episode: "Maddon's Folly") as Bentley CoombsThe Outer Limits (1963, Episode: "Corpus Earthling") as CaretakerThe Name of the Game (1968, Episode: "Ordeal") as WilliamGunsmoke'' (1975, Episode: "I Have Promises to Keep") as Tonkowa

References

External links
Ken Renard on Find a Grave
Ken Renard on IMDb

1905 births
1993 deaths
People from Port of Spain
Trinidad and Tobago emigrants to the United States
Burials at Westwood Village Memorial Park Cemetery